Bloom Township is one of the nineteen townships of Wood County, Ohio, United States. The 2010 census found 2,609 people living in the township.

Geography
Located in the southern part of the county, it borders the following townships:
Portage Township - north
Montgomery Township - northeast corner
Perry Township - east
Washington Township, Hancock County - southeast corner
Cass Township, Hancock County - south
Allen Township, Hancock County - southwest
Henry Township - west
Liberty Township - northwest corner

Several villages are located in Bloom Township:
Bairdstown, in the south
Bloomdale, in the southeast
Cygnet, in the northwest
Part of Jerry City, in the north

Name and history
Bloom Township was established in 1835. Statewide, other Bloom Townships are located in Fairfield, Morgan, Scioto, and Seneca counties.

Government
The township is governed by a three-member board of trustees, who are elected in November of odd-numbered years to a four-year term beginning on the following January 1. Two are elected in the year after the presidential election and one is elected in the year before it. There is also an elected township fiscal officer, who serves a four-year term beginning on April 1 of the year after the election, which is held in November of the year before the presidential election. Vacancies in the fiscal officership or on the board of trustees are filled by the remaining trustees.

Township Officials

References

External links
County website

Townships in Wood County, Ohio
Townships in Ohio